Bothriomyrmex corsicus is a species of ant in the genus Bothriomyrmex. Described by Santschi in 1923, the species is endemic to various European countries, including Austria, Bulgaria, Czech Republic, France, Greece, Hungary, Italy, Liechtenstein, Monaco, Montenegro, Romania, Serbia, Slovakia, Slovenia, Spain, Switzerland, Turkey, Ukraine.

References

Bothriomyrmex
Hymenoptera of Europe
Insects described in 1923